North Garo Hills is an administrative district in the state of Meghalaya in India. The district headquarters are located at Resubelpara.  The district occupies an area of 1,113 km2 and has a population of 1,18,325 (as of 2001).

History

The North Garo Hills district was carved out of the erstwhile East Garo Hills district. And whereas for public convenience and better administration the Governor of Meghalaya considers it necessary to upgrade the said Resubelpara Civil Sub-Division of East Garo Hills District into a full·fledged District.

Geography

Resubelpara is the district headquarters of North Garo Hills District.

References

External links 
 Official website

 
Districts of Meghalaya
2012 establishments in Meghalaya
Autonomous regions of India